Kim Hyung-soo (born December 30, 1981), better known by his stage name K.Will, is a South Korean singer. The name is a combination of the first letter 'K' of his last name 'Kim' and the English word 'Will', which means will. He debuted in 2007 and has since become known for his chart-topping ballads. He has also been dubbed the "Prince of OST" for his frequent Korean drama soundtrack appearances.

K.Will has released four full-length albums: Left Heart (2007), Missing You (2009), The Third Album (2012–2013), and The Fourth Album (2017–2018).

Career

Pre-debut 
Prior to his debut, K.Will trained to be a singer for five years under producer Bang Si-hyuk. He also worked as a "guide vocal," singing demos of songs that would ultimately be recorded by other artists including TVXQ, g.o.d. and Rain. During this time, he was dubbed the "male Mariah Carey," after a video of him singing Carey's songs became popular on South Korean websites.

2007–2009: Debut and Starship Entertainment 
K.Will released his first album, Left Heart, on March 6, 2007 via Bang's label Big Hit Entertainment. Producer J.Y. Park composed the album's title song, which reached #3 on the Melon digital chart shortly after its release. That year, K.Will also released the hit song, "Moon Setting Alone," from the War of Money soundtrack, and was voted the best new singer of 2007 in a survey of South Korean television writers.

In January 2008, K.Will left Big Hit and joined his agent Kim Shi-dae's new company Starship Entertainment. On December 2, 2008, he released his first digital single under Starship, "Love 119" (a collaboration with rapper MC Mong). The single reached #1 on various online music charts and ranked #2 on the KBS Music Bank chart without any promotions.

K.Will released his first extended play, Dropping the Tears, featuring a title track of the same name, on March 31, 2009. While promoting the album, he gave voice lessons to Lee Min-ho, the lead actor in the television series Boys Over Flowers, to prepare Lee for recording the song "My Everything" for the show's soundtrack.

K.Will made his acting debut in September alongside Han Hyo-joo in the web series Soul Special.

On November 5, 2009, he released his second album, Missing You. The album's lead single, "Miss, Miss and Miss," was a success. However the second single, "Hypnosis" featuring rapper Outsider, was banned from airing on KBS because it contained the word “mute”, which the network said could be degrading to people with disabilities. K.Will's agency, Starship Entertainment, said in a statement that the lyrics were meant to be a metaphor for people who can't express their feelings.

In early December, K.Will performed at the 2009 Hallyu Music Festival in Sapporo and Tokyo, Japan. On December 25, he held his first solo concert in Seoul.

2010–2011: International expansion 
K.Will debuted in the United States at "THE THREE ROMANTICISTS" concert along with Kim Bum Soo and Yoo Seung-Chan on March 5, 2010. His single titled "Present"  was released on March 10, 2010 and achieved #1 on many online music charts. 

K.Will embarked on his first solo concert in Japan, "K.WILL Live Concert with Band in Tokyo" in May 2010 and "K.WILL Live Concert with Band in Osaka" in July 2010. On the July 31, K.Will appeared on the music show "The MUZIT" as one of the main MCs along with upperclassmen singer Yoo Young Suk . On the first episode K.Will and Charice performed the duet "Endless Love".

At the end of the year, K.Will's two-day Christmas concert was completely sold out.

A year after his second album, K.Will released another digital single featuring Simon D and Hyorin of Sistar titled "Amazed" on January 21, 2011. The song rapidly reached to the top of the several music charts. Seven weeks later, K.Will's second mini album was released and he held a live showcase, performance, and released the music video for "My Heart is Beating" in which Lee Joon (MBLAQ) and IU starred. The title track of this album was an all-kill on music charts. Five years since his debut, K.Will finally won the Mutizen on SBS Inkigayo.

K.Will successfully completed his third solo concert, "My Heart Is Beating" at the Olympic Park Hall on June 25, 2011. He has also participated several variety shows such as "We Got Married" with Kim Hyung Jun, the drama "Spy Myung Wol" and the reality show "Immortal Songs 2" nearly the end of the year.

As per tradition, he ended the year with a 3-day Christmas concert.

After joining KBS TV "Immortal Songs 2" in November 2011, K.Will left the show after winning three times, and set the new record, winning against 5 consecutive singers in the leaving episode on January 21, 2012.

2012–2016: The Third Album and collaborations 
On February 14, 2012, K.Will released his 3rd mini album I Need You two weeks after releasing a digital single of one of the songs from the mini album titled "I Hate Myself". On the same day, K.Will also unveiled a music video for "I Need You" on Starship Entertainment's official YouTube channel which features Sistar's Bora and actors Ji Chang Wook and Yeo Jin Gu. "I Need You" peaked at No. 2 on the Billboard K-Pop Hot 100, while "I Hate Myself" peaked at no. 6. The album marked the five-year anniversary of K.Will's debut as a singer-songwriter. His self-composed song, "I'll Be With You" is also included and is dedicated to all his fans who believed in him. He was also the co-writer the lyrics of "I'm Will." K.Will earned his first K-Chart award since his debut 6 years ago on KBS Music Bank for his track "I Need You."

On October 7, Starship Entertainment revealed some photos of K.Will's recent photoshoot for his upcoming album. The album Third Album, Part 1 was released on October 11 along with the MV for "Please Don't...", the title track. Promotions for "Please Don't..." were the most successful in K.Will's career to date. The music video starred Seo In-guk, Sistar's Dasom, and Ahn Jae-hyun, and was praised for its originality. It was also notable for its twist ending involving Seo's character revealing he is actually in love with Ahn's.

On February 14, 2013, Powerhouse Live (U.S.) presented K.Will in a Valentine's Day solo concert in the Orpheum Theatre in Los Angeles, California. He performed his hits, including "Please Don't...", "I Need You", "My Heart is Beating", and "Love 119". On April 3, K.Will released his new single, "Love Blossom." On October 19, K.Will released his new album, Will in Fall. The music video for the album's single, "You Don't Know Love", starring EXO rapper Chanyeol and South Korean model Lee Ho Jung, came out two days later, on October 21.

On February 11, 2014, Mamamoo did a collaboration with K.Will with the single "Peppermint Chocolate" featuring Wheesung. On June 25, K.Will released his mini album, One Fine Day. The music video for the title track, "Day 1", starred Sistar's Soyou and Park Min-woo.

On March 25, 2015, K.Will released his mini album, [Re:]. The music video for the title track, "Growing", starred Son Ho-jun and Park Ha-sun.

On January 3, 2016, Starship Entertainment released music video teasers of K.Will's single "You Call It Romance" featuring Davichi. The music video was released on January 6, starring Hyungwon, actor Choi Won Myung, and actress Yoon Ye Joo. On May 10, S.M. Entertainment revealed K.Will would feature on a duet with Baekhyun of EXO entitled "The Day".  The song was released on May 13.

2017–present: The 4th Album 
On July 30, 2017, K.Will stated on his personal Twitter that he would be working on completing his next album. The album, titled The 4th Album Part.1 [Nonfiction], was officially announced on September 12 and released on September 26, along with an accompanying music video for the title track "Nonfiction".

On May 10, 2018, K.Will released The 4th Album Part.2 #1 'Will Be a Start' as the first of a trilogy of three singles that will lead up to the release of the full The 4th Album Part.2. He also released the music video for "My Star (너란 별)" on the same day. On October 28, 2018, K.Will revealed the tracklist for The 4th Album Part.2 [想像; Mood Indigo], and an album teaser was released three days later. The album was released on November 6, with K.Will co-producing each song.

In February 2020, K.Will renewed his contract with Starship Entertainment.

On August 12, 2022, it was announced that K.will will begin the nationwide Here and Now tour, to be held in October.

Discography

 Left Heart (2007)
 Missing You (2009)
 The Third Album (2012–2013)
 The 4th Album (2017–2018)

Concerts and tours
K.Will 1st Concert (2009)
K.Will 1st Live With Band (2010)
K.Will Concert "My Heart Is Beating" (2011)
K.Will Tour (2012)
K.Will Japan Tour "I Need You" (2012)
K.Will "Ke.Dae.Bak" Concert (2012)
K.Will Valentine Concert "Be My Valentine" (2013)
K.Will Small Theater Concert "If You Leave, It's A Pain (2013)
K.Will Live In Japan "The Romántic" (2013)
K.Will Japan Tour (2014)
K.Will "Ke Dae Bak" Concert (2014)
K.Will Japan New Year Live (2015)
K.Will & Urban Zakapa "One Sweet Day" Concert (2015)
K.Will Japan Tour (2015)
K.Will Concert (2015–2016)
K.Will National Tour Concert (2016–2017)
K.Will & Wheesung "Bromance Show" Concert (2016)
K.Will National Tour Concert (2016–2017)
K.Will Concert "The K.Will" (2017–2018)

Filmography

Dramas

Music videos

Variety shows

Awards and nominations

References

External links
 

1981 births
Living people
Vocal coaches
South Korean pop singers
People from Seoul
Starship Entertainment artists
MAMA Award winners
Melon Music Award winners
21st-century South Korean male singers